Nelson Robinette Webb (January 29, 1939 – February 3, 2021) was an American voice artist, best known as the voice of 60 Minutes and the CBS Evening News. He did voice overs for thousands of TV spots.

Webb was from Whitesburg, Kentucky. In addition to his television work, Webb was the narrator for Fishing with John. 

Five days after his 82nd birthday, he died from complications of COVID-19 in New York City during the COVID-19 pandemic in New York City.

References

External links
 

1939 births
2021 deaths
American male voice actors
Deaths from the COVID-19 pandemic in New York (state)
People from Whitesburg, Kentucky